The Next Generation poets are a list of young and middle-aged figures from British poetry, mostly British, compiled by a panel for the Poetry Book Society in 2004. This is a promotional exercise, and a sequel to the New Generation poets (1994). The "Next Generation" was followed by Staple magazine's "Alternative Generation" (2005), which selected a group of poets from the UK's small-press output. The Next Generation 2004 list comprises:

Patience Agbabi
Amanda Dalton
Nick Drake
Jane Draycott
Paul Farley
Leontia Flynn
Matthew Francis
Sophie Hannah
Tobias Hill
Gwyneth Lewis
Alice Oswald
Pascale Petit
Jacob Polley
Deryn Rees-Jones
Maurice Riordan
Robin Robertson
Owen Sheers
Henry Shukman
Catherine Smith
Jean Sprackland

See also
 New Generation poets (1994)
 Next Generation poets (2014)

References

External links
 Next generation poets 2004 coverage on The Guardian website

British literary movements
British poetry